Al-Daymah is a sub-district located in Nati' District, Al Bayda Governorate, Yemen.  Al-Daymah had a population of 772 according to the 2004 census.

References 

Sub-districts in Nati' District